Charles Coulombe may refer to:

 Charles A. Coulombe (born 1960), American Catholic author and lecturer
 Charles Jérémie Coulombe (1846–1937), physician and political figure in Quebec

See also
 Charles-Augustin de Coulomb (1736–1806), French physicist